Gustavo Ramos Vasconcelos de Oliveira (born 2 July 1996), known as Gustavo Ramos or Gustavinho, is a Brazilian footballer who plays as a forward for Portuguesa.

Club career
Born in Crixás, Goiás, Gustavo Ramos was a Vila Nova youth graduate. He made his first team debut on 31 March 2013, aged 16, coming on as a second-half substitute for Thiago Marin in a 2–2 Campeonato Goiano home draw against Anápolis.

Gustavo Ramos scored his first goal on 21 April 2013, netting his side's second in a 3–0 home win over Rio Verde. On 24 January 2015, after being regularly used in the main squad, he was loaned to Internacional and returned to the youth setup.

On 4 February 2016, Gustavo Ramos joined Inter permanently. He was loaned to Ypiranga-RS for the 2017 Campeonato Gaúcho, before signing for Aparecidense in November 2017.

On 12 December 2018, after a short period at Red Bull Brasil, Gustavo Ramos was presented at Remo. On 28 October 2019, he moved to Sampaio Corrêa after failing to agree a contract renewal.

On 2 February 2021, Gustavo Ramos joined Caxias. He agreed to a deal with Confiança on 18 June, but moved to São Bernardo on 21 September, for the year's Copa Paulista.

On 5 April 2022, Gustavo Ramos signed a contract with Figueirense. On 1 December, he was announced as the new signing of Portuguesa.

Career statistics

Honours
Internacional
Super Copa Gaúcha: 2016

Remo
Campeonato Paraense: 2019

Sampaio Corrêa
Campeonato Maranhense: 2020

São Bernardo
Copa Paulista: 2021

References

External links
Futebol de Goyaz profile 

1996 births
Living people
Sportspeople from Goiás
Brazilian footballers
Association football forwards
Campeonato Brasileiro Série B players
Campeonato Brasileiro Série C players
Vila Nova Futebol Clube players
Sport Club Internacional players
Ypiranga Futebol Clube players
Associação Atlética Aparecidense players
Red Bull Brasil players
Clube do Remo players
Sampaio Corrêa Futebol Clube players
Sociedade Esportiva e Recreativa Caxias do Sul players
Associação Desportiva Confiança players
São Bernardo Futebol Clube players
Figueirense FC players
Associação Portuguesa de Desportos players